Francisca de Aculodi (fl. 1689) was a Spanish editor and journalist. 

When her spouse died in 1678, she inherited his printing privilege and title of “Impresora de la Muy Noble y Muy Leal Provincia de Guipúzcoa”. She founded and published the San Sebastián newspaper Noticias Principales y Verdaderas from 1683. doi:10.4000/argonauta.431. She has been referred to as the first female journalist in Europe, prior to Elizabeth Mallet, founder of the Daily Courant in 1702.

See also
 List of women printers and publishers before 1800

References 

17th-century Spanish women writers
17th-century Spanish writers
17th-century printers
17th-century publishers (people)
17th-century Spanish businesswomen
17th-century Spanish businesspeople
Women printers
17th-century journalists
17th-century women journalists